Diesel and Shawn Michaels formed a tag team, also known as Two Dudes with Attitudes that competed in the World Wrestling Federation (WWF, now known as WWE) in 1994 and again in 1995 through March 1996, with a brief reunion in 2002 as a sub-group of the New World Order stable. The team held the WWF Tag Team Championship twice, but also found success in singles competition while still allied with one another, as Diesel held the WWF Championship and Intercontinental Championship once each and Michaels held the Intercontinental Championship twice.

History

First run (1993–1994) 
The two first got together in mid-1993, when Diesel became a bodyguard for Intercontinental Champion Shawn Michaels. During 1993 and 1994, both Michael and Diesel held the WWF Intercontinental Championship. Diesel helped Michaels win the Intercontinental Championship from Marty Jannetty on June 6, 1993. In mid-1994, Michaels acted as Diesel's manager, leading him to win the Intercontinental Championship from Razor Ramon.

The duo transformed into a tag team when Michaels and Diesel defeated The Headshrinkers at a house show to win the WWF Tag Team Championship on August 28, 1994 in Indianapolis, Indiana, days before interference by Michaels backfired and cost Diesel the Intercontinental Championship at SummerSlam on August 29, 1994. At Survivor Series on November 23, 1994, Michaels once again accidentally hit Diesel with a superkick. The team subsequently split, vacating the WWF Tag Team Championship. Three days later, Diesel squashed Bob Backlund at a house show to win the WWF Championship.

Second run (1995-1996) 
In early 1995, Michaels and Diesel feuded over the WWF Championship. Michaels won the Royal Rumble and unsuccessfully challenged Diesel in a title match at WrestleMania XI on April 2, 1995. On the April 3, 1995 episode of Monday Night Raw, Diesel came to rescue Michaels from an attack by his replacement bodyguard, Sid.

The two wrestlers, Michaels and Diesel, joined forces in 1995 under the name "Two Dudes with Attitudes." At In Your House 3 on September 24, 1995, they challenged WWF Tag Team Champions Owen Hart and Yokozuna to a match in which the WWF Tag Team Championship, Diesel's WWF Championship, and Michaels' Intercontinental Championship were all on the line. Diesel and Michaels won the match and the WWF Tag Team Championship but had to return it to Hart and Yokozuna the next day on a technicality following lobbying from Hart's and Yokozuna's lawyer, Clarence Mason.

Two Dudes with Attitudes disbanded for a second time after Diesel lost the WWF Championship to Bret Hart at Survivor Series on November 19, 1995. On January 21, 1996, Michaels won the Royal Rumble for a second consecutive year, eliminating Diesel in the process. After Michaels won the WWF Championship from Hart at WrestleMania XII on March 31, 1996, Diesel unsuccessfully challenged him at In Your House 7: Good Friends, Better Enemies on April 28, 1996. Diesel and Michaels continued to feud until Diesel's departure from the WWF in May 1996.

Reunions (2002, 2003) 
Michaels and Nash did not reunite until June 3, 2002, when Nash named Michaels as the newest member of the New World Order (nWo). On the June 10 episode of Raw, Michaels explained that his best friend Nash was always there for him, which was why he returned to WWE to become a member of the nWo. He then shocked the audience by hitting Booker T with a superkick to remove him from the nWo.

A month later, Nash tore his quadriceps, which broke up the nWo. When Nash returned from his injury in 2003, the duo teamed with Booker T to face Evolution (Triple H, Ric Flair, and Randy Orton) in an effort to have Nash win the World Heavyweight Championship from Triple H. At Judgment Day, Nash came close to winning the title until Triple H got himself disqualified when he hit referee Earl Hebner with the sledgehammer in the chest. Nash later left the WWE soon after SummerSlam when he was the first to be eliminated in the Elimination Chamber match after Michaels hit him with a superkick.

Championships and accomplishments 
 World Wrestling Federation
 WWF Championship (1 time) – Diesel
 WWF Intercontinental Championship (3 times) – Michaels (2) and Diesel (1)
 WWF Tag Team Championship (2 times)

References

External links 
 
 

The Kliq members
WWE teams and stables
WWE World Tag Team Champions